Henry Stewart (born 5 August 1763 at Hambledon, Hampshire; died 12 March 1837 at Hambledon) was an English amateur cricketer who made 3 known appearances in first-class cricket matches from 1788 to 1806.

Career
He was mainly associated with Hampshire.

References

External sources
 CricketArchive record

1763 births
1837 deaths
English cricketers
English cricketers of 1787 to 1825
Hampshire cricketers